The Kachhwaha or Kachawa is a Rajput clan found primarily in India. Sometimes families within the clan ruled a number of kingdoms and princely states, such as Jaipur, Bihar, Uttar Pradesh, Madhya Pradesh, Alwar and Maihar.

Subclans
Rajawat, Shekhawat, Naruka, Bikawat, Khangarot, Nathawat, Dhirawat, Bandhalgoti etc.are subclans of Kachwahas of Jaipur House.

Clan deities
Jamway Mata is their Clan Goddess (kuldevi). Historical temple dedicated to Jamway Mata is present in Jamwaramgarh sub-division of Jaipur District, Rajasthan. This temple was built by Raja Dulhe Rai Kachawaha after he won battle due to Goddess's blessings.

Etymology
According to Cynthia Talbot, the meaning of word Kachhwaha is tortoise.

Origin
There are many theories on the origin of the Kachhwahas.

Suryavansh Origin 
Suryavansh Dynasty or Ikshwaku Dynasty or Raghuvansh Dynasty : Kachwaha claim descent from Kusha, a son of the avatar of Vishnu, Rama, as expressed by them citing historical documents during the Supreme court of India proceedings on Ram Mandir at Ayodhya. Ish Devji a Kachhwaha Raja of outstanding merit, with his capital at Gwalior, is recorded to have died in 967 A.D. Brahmin genealogists place him as being the three hundred & third generation after Ikshwaku. The Kachhwahas of Amber are descendants of Ish Devji. According to Rima Hooja, the Kachhwaha word became popular in the late 16th century during the reign of Raja Man Singh. There are many inscriptions and manuscripts which prove this theory, like the ones found in Balvan, Chatsu, Sanganer and Rewasa.

Kurma Avtar Origin 
Another view-point is that the Kachhawahas claim descent from Vishnu's turtle avatar.

Kacchapaghat Origin 
T.H. Hendley states in his Rulers of India and the Chiefs of Rajputana (1897), that the Kachwaha clan is believed to have settled in an early era at Rohtas (Rahatas) on the Son River in present-day Bihar. He notes that their notable seats of power were Kutwar, Gwalior, Dubkhund, Simhapaniya and Narwar (Nalapura) (all in present-day Madhya Pradesh). This second westward migration to Madhaya Pradesh is said to have been initiated under Raja Nala, the legendary founder of Narwar.

Historians state that the Kacchapaghatas, like the Chandellas and Paramaras, originated as tributaries of the preceding powers of the region. They point out that it was only following the downfall, during the 8th–10th centuries AD, of Kannauj (regional seat of power following the breakup of Harsha's empire), that the Kacchapaghata state emerged as a principal power in the Chambal valley of present-day Madhya Pradesh. This view is largely supported by archaeological artifacts: Kacchapaghata coinage (minted Gupta-fashion) discovered in Madhya Pradesh and Gopaksetra inscriptions.

According to Rudolf Hoernle (1905), the Kachhwahas are related to the Gurjara-Pratiharas. He identifies similarities between the names of the line of rulers of Kannauj (mid-10th century) with the recorded line of eight Kachwaha rulers of Gwalior (based on the Sas-Bahu inscription of Mahipal).

After Sumitra, Madhubramh, Kanh, Devanik and Isha Singh ruled Narwar. The Sas-Bahu inscription dates to 1093, and provides a genealogy of the ruling family up to Mahipal (who died sometime before 1104).

Kachhwahas are the descendants of Kachchhapaghatas of Rajasthan and Madhya Pradesh.

History

Conquest of Dhundhar 
Kachhwaha established their kingdoms in the Dhundhar region of modern Rajasthan in the 11th century. One Kachhwaha Dulha Rai conquered most of the dhundhar area from Bargujars Rajputs.

Raja Kakil deo 
After Dulherai, his son Kakil Deo defeated the Meenas of Amer and made Amer the capital of Dhundhar after Khoh.

Raja Pajawan 
Raja Pajawan helped Prithviraj Chauhan in his most of the campaigns and conquests. He was married to a cousin of Prithviraj Chauhan. He died before the battle of Tarain.

Raja Prithviraj Singh I 
Kachhwaha King Prithviraj Singh I fought along with Rana Sanga at battle of Khanwa.

Raja Man Singh I 
He was one of the most trusted noble of Akbar. He was the supreme commander of the Mughal forces. He built the Amer Fort. He built and saved so many Hindu temples from Islamic destruction.

Sawai Jai Singh II 
He built the pink city of Jaipur and five astronomical observatives at Delhi, Jaipur, Benaras, Mathura and Ujjain. He also established Govind Dev Ji  temple at Jaipur.

Princely States 
The Jaipur royal family is considered to be the head house of Kachhwahas. At the time of India's independence in 1947 there were so many princely states, jagirs, thikanas and other estate ruled by various branches of Kachhwaha clan across entire India. Some princely states included :

 Jaipur (Dhundhar), in present-day Rajasthan, founded in 966 by Raja Sodh Dev
 Alwar, in present-day Rajasthan, founded in 1770 by Rao Raja Pratap Singh Naruka
 Darkoti, in present-day Himachal Pradesh, founded in 1787 by Rana Balram
 Maihar, in present-day Madhya Pradesh, founded in 1778 by Raja Beni Singh
 Keonjhar, in present-day Orissa, founded in 1480 by Raja Govind Bhanj
 Talcher, in present-day Orissa, founded in 1471 by Raja Narhari Singh

Notable people

Amer Kingdom
 Pajawan
 Prithviraj Singh I
 Bharmal
 Bhagwant Das
 Man Singh I
 Mirza Raja Jai Singh I

Jaipur State
 Maharaja Sawai Jai Singh II
 Maharaja Ram Singh I
 Maharaja Sawai Madho Singh I
 Maharaja Sawai Pratap Singh
 Maharaja Sawai Man Singh II
 Maharani Gayatri Devi
 Maharaja Sawai Bhawani Singh
 Princess Diya Kumari
 Maharaja Padmanabh Singh

Alwar State
 Rao Raja Pratap Singh
 Colonel HH Raj Rishi Shri Sawai Maharaja Sir Jai Singh
 HH Raj Rishi Shri Sawai Maharaja Jitendra Singh
 Rajkumari Bhuvneshwari Kumari

Shekhawati Region
 Rao Shekha
 Ajit Singh of Khetri

References

Further reading
Bayley C. (1894) Chiefs and Leading Families in Rajputana
Henige, David (2004). Princely states of India;A guide to chronology and rulers
Jyoti J. (2001) Royal Jaipur
Krishnadatta Kavi, Gopalnarayan Bahura(editor) (1983) Pratapa Prakasa, a contemporary account of life in the court at Jaipur in the late 18th century
 Khangarot, R.S., and P.S. Nathawat (1990). Jaigarh- The invincible Fort of Amber
Topsfield, A. (1994). Indian paintings from Oxford collections
Tillotson, G. (2006). Jaipur Nama, Penguin books

Suryavansha
Rajput clans